The 2018 Harlow District Council election took place on 3 May 2018 to elect members of Harlow District Council in Essex. This was on the same day as other local elections. Labour increased their majority on the council by gaining one seat.

After the election, the composition of the council was:
Labour 20
Conservative 13

Results Summary

|-bgcolor=#F6F6F6
| colspan=2 style="text-align: right; margin-right: 1em" | Total
| style="text-align: right;" | 33
| colspan=5 |
| style="text-align: right;" | 17,897
| style="text-align: right;" | 
|-
|colspan="11" bgcolor=""|
|-
| style="background:"|
| colspan="10"| Labour hold

Ward results

Bush Fair

Church Langley

Great Parndon

Harlow Common

Little Parndon and Hare Street

Mark Hall

Nettleswell

Old Harlow

Staple Tye

Summers & Kingsmoor

Toddbrook

By-elections between 2018 and 2019

Bush Fair
A by-election was held in Bush Fair on 8 November 2018 after the resignation of Labour councillor Ian Beckett.
The seat was held for Labour by Joseph Dunne.

Nettleswell
A by-election was held in Nettleswell on 8 November 2018 after the resignation of Labour councillor Waida Forman.
The seat was held for Labour by Shannon Jezzard.

Toddbrook
A by-election was held in Toddbrook on 13 December 2018 after the resignation of Labour councillor Karen Clempner.
The seat was held for Labour by Frances Mason.

References

2018 English local elections
2018
2010s in Essex